Alfonso R. Marquez (March 29, 1938 - April 15, 2020), better known as Boy Marquez, was a Filipino basketball player and coach. Marquez was born in Zamboanga City, Philippines.

Youth career
Alfonso Marquez played for the high school team of Ateneo de Zamboanga where he was mentored by a Jesuit priest. He was later scouted by coach Eddie Gullas who convinced him to suit up for the Green Lancers collegiate team of the University of Visayas (UV). He came into wider public attention due to UV's upset 74-63 win against the Ateneo de Manila in an intercollegiate tournament in Manila in 1957. In that game, Marquez who was 19-years-old at that time is the third highest UV scorer accounting for 16 points for the Green Lancers.

Club career
Marquez joined Ysmael Steel Admirals in 1958. He won six championships as a part of the Ysmael Steel squad. An all-around player, he could play the center, forward and guard positions. He later played for Meralco and Mariwasa during the 1970s in the Manila Industrial and Commercial Athletic Association.

International career
Marquez was a former member of Philippine national team. His performance playing with the University of Visayas gained the attention of head coach Baby Dalupan helping Marquez secure a place in the Philippines roster for the 1959 FIBA World Championship in Chile.

Marquez has also suited up for the Philippines at the Olympic Games participating in 1960 edition in Rome and the 1968 edition in Mexico City. In the 1960 Summer Olympics, the Philippines placed 11th and in 1968, the national squad placed 13th. Marquez played a significant role in the Philippines' 63-60 win against South Korea in the play off for 13th place. Marquez contributed the most points for the Philippines in that game scoring 18 points while his Korean counterpart Shin Dong-pa made 16 points for his team.

Retirement and later life
Marquez retired from competitive basketball to focus on his family. He held a management position at the Kamuning branch of Meralco and later held a position in the government accounts department in the main office of the same electricity company. In his later years leading to his death on April 15, 2020, Marquez had been in frail health.

References

External links
 

2020 deaths
1938 births
Sportspeople from Zamboanga City
Basketball players from Zamboanga del Sur
Olympic basketball players of the Philippines
Basketball players at the 1960 Summer Olympics
Basketball players at the 1968 Summer Olympics
Asian Games medalists in basketball
Basketball players at the 1962 Asian Games
Basketball players at the 1966 Asian Games
Philippines men's national basketball team players
Filipino men's basketball players
1959 FIBA World Championship players
Asian Games gold medalists for the Philippines
UV Green Lancers basketball players
Medalists at the 1962 Asian Games